Laura E. Schulz is a professor of cognitive science at the brain and cognitive sciences department of the Massachusetts Institute of Technology. She is the principal investigator of the Early Childhood Cognition Lab at MIT. Schulz is known for her work on early childhood development of cognition, causal inference, discovery, and learning.

Education 
Schulz received a Bachelor of Arts with a major in philosophy from the University of Michigan in 1992. She received a Master of Arts and a Doctor of Philosophy both in psychology from the University of California, Berkeley in 2002 and 2004, respectively.

Career

While at Berkeley, she worked closely with Alison Gopnik, researching computational models of cognition. In 2005, Schulz joined the faculty at the Massachusetts Institute of Technology (MIT). There, alongside Pawan Sinha, she runs the post-baccalaureate Research Scholars Program in Brain and Cognitive Sciences, working to prepare disadvantaged students for graduate school.

Schulz is the principal investigator of the Early Childhood Cognition Lab at MIT, studying learning in early childhood.

Research 
Schulz's research focuses on children's cognition, specifically how children begin to form their world-views from the facets of information they obtain every day. Her work focuses on three main topics within children cognition. One of the topics is how children process the information they've gained in order to better infer, interact, and explain the world around them. Another topic is on the factors that allows children express curiosity and explore their environment, which also allow them to strengthen their cognition. Finally, how the information gained from the previous points will interact with one another to form their social cognition and ultimately build their sense of self and their interactions with others. Her data and observations come from two laboratories, one at the Boston Children's Museum and the other at the Discovery Center in the Museum of Science, Boston. At these laboratories she uses infant-looking time methods and free-play paradigms, as well as other methods, to study babies and children. She chooses to observe these subjects in particular, because in order to understand the origins of knowledge and fundamental principles of learning in humans, one must start at the beginning when babies have limited prior knowledge.

As of 2020, she has 95 publications including articles, data, and papers, 20 of which were completed during her time at The Center for Brains, Minds and Machines (CBMM) at  MIT. In March 2015 she gave a TED talk called "The surprisingly logical minds of babies", which has since had almost 2 million views.

Personal life

Schulz is the daughter of teacher Margot Schulz and lawyer Isaac Schulz. Her sister, Kathryn Schulz, is a staff writer for The New Yorker. She is married to Sue Kaufman and has four children: Henry Philofsky, MJ Kaufman, Rachel Novick, and Adele Kaufman-Schulz.

Awards and recognition
 American Psychological Association Distinguished Scientific Award for Early Career Contribution to Psychology, 2014
 MIT MacVicar Faculty Fellow, 2013
 National Academy of Sciences, Troland Research Award, 2012
 Society for Research in Child Development, Award for Early Career Research Contributions, 2011
 National Academy of Sciences, Kavli Fellow, 2011
 MIT Brain and Cognitive Science Award Angus MacDonald Award for Excellence in Undergraduate Teaching, 2011
 MIT Sigma Xi, Invited Speaker, 2011
 Marr Prize, Cognitive Science Society (student author: Hyowon Gweon), 2010
 NSF Presidential Early Career Award for Scientists and Engineers, 2009
 John Merck Scholars Foundation Award, 2009
 Class of 1943 MIT Career Development Professorship, 2009
 MIT Brain and Cognitive Science Award for Excellence in Undergraduate Advising, 2009
 NSF Faculty Early Career Development award, 2007
 MIT School of Science Prize for Excellence in Undergraduate Teaching, 2007
 Marr Prize, Cognitive Science Society (student author: Elizabeth Bonawitz), 2006
 American Association of University Women, American Dissertation Fellowship, 2004
 National Science Foundation Graduate Research Fellowship Award, 2001
 Hewlett Foundation Graduate Fellowship Award, 2000

References

External links
 Laura Schulz MIT Faculty Page
 Early Childhood Cognition Lab Page
 People in the Early Childhood Cognition Lab : Laura Schulz
 
 "The surprisingly logical minds of babies" (TED2015)

American women psychologists
Cognitive development researchers
American cognitive scientists
Living people
Massachusetts Institute of Technology School of Science faculty
University of California, Berkeley alumni
University of Michigan College of Literature, Science, and the Arts alumni
Women cognitive scientists
Year of birth missing (living people)
20th-century American psychologists
21st-century American psychologists
American women academics
21st-century American women